Troy Airport may refer to:

 Troy Airport in Troy, Montana, United States (FAA: 57S)
 Troy Municipal Airport in Troy, Alabama, United States (FAA/IATA: TOI)
 Troy Skypark in Troy, Ohio, United States (FAA: 37I)
 Oakland/Troy Airport in Troy, Michigan, United States (FAA: VLL)